Saint Richard is Richard of Chichester (aka Richard of Wyche, Richard of Wych, Richard of Droitwich, Richard of Burford).  

Saint Richard may also refer to:

 Richard the Pilgrim, supposed father of Saints Willibald, Winibald, and Walpurga
 Richard of Andria 
 Richard of Vaucelles
 Richard Reynolds (martyr)
 Richard Gwyn
 Richard Pampuri
 Richard Martin (martyr), English

See also
 
 

Title and name disambiguation pages